13154 Petermrva, provisional designation , is a stony Flora asteroid from the inner regions of the asteroid belt, approximately 4.2 kilometers in diameter. It was discovered on 7 September 1995, by Slovak astronomers Adrián Galád and Alexander Pravda at the Modra Observatory in the Bratislava Region of Slovakia. The asteroid was named after Slovak amateur astronomer Peter Mrva.

Orbit and classification 

Petermrva is a member of the Flora family, one of the largest families of stony asteroids. It orbits the Sun in the inner main-belt at a distance of 1.8–2.6 AU once every 3 years and 3 months (1,200 days). Its orbit has an eccentricity of 0.17 and an inclination of 6° with respect to the ecliptic. The first precovery was taken at Crimea-Nauchnij in 1972, extending the asteroid's observation arc by 23 years prior to its discovery.

Physical characteristics 

According to the thermal observation carried out by the NEOWISE mission of NASA's Wide-field Infrared Survey Explorer, Petermrva measures 4.2 kilometer and has an untypically low albedo of 0.15.

Naming 

This minor planet is named after Slovak amateur astronomer Peter Mrva (born 1962) who participated in the construction the discovering Modra Observatory, after which the minor planet 11118 Modra is named. He was also one of the first observers at the newly installed observatory. The second discoverer, Alexander Pravda, is thankful for his explanation and inspiration in some fields of astronomy and computer graphics. The approved naming citation was published by the Minor Planet Center on 27 April 2002.

Notes

References

External links 
 Ondrejov Asteroid Photometry Project, Pravec, P.; Wolf, M.; Sarounova, L. (2008)
 Asteroid Lightcurve Database (LCDB), query form (info )
 Dictionary of Minor Planet Names, Google books
 Asteroids and comets rotation curves, CdR – Observatoire de Genève, Raoul Behrend
 Discovery Circumstances: Numbered Minor Planets (10001)-(15000) – Minor Planet Center
 
 

013154
Discoveries by Adrián Galád
Discoveries by Alexander Pravda
Named minor planets
19950907